SS Nieuw Amsterdam was a ship built in Belfast by Harland and Wolff. It was launched in 1905 and on April 7, 1906, made its first voyage to New York from Rotterdam.

The Nieuw Amsterdam was fitted with sails, but they were never deployed; it was the first quadruple expansion powered ship of the Holland America Line. In 1914, the ship brought almost 1,700 United States citizens back from Europe at the outbreak of World War I. In 1917 she took 2,300 Dutch seamen from the United States back to Holland. The ship was renovated in 1918 and overhauled in 1925 to a "cabin/tourist configuration". It became the first ship to bring immigrants to the large new Canadian immigration terminal Pier 21 at Halifax, Nova Scotia, on March 8, 1928, and made 31 voyages to Pier 21 with Dutch immigrants before its retirement. The last transatlantic passenger trip was made from Rotterdam on October 2, 1931, for New York. Nieuw Amsterdam arrived in Japan in February 1932 where it was scrapped.

References

Ships of the Holland America Line
1905 ships
Ships built in Belfast
Ships built by Harland and Wolff